Paweł Robert Kowal (born 22 July 1975 in Rzeszów) is a Polish politician and former Member of the European Parliament. During his time in the EP, he served as the Chairman of the EU-Ukraine Parliamentary Cooperation Committee in the European Parliament.

Kowal was elected to the Sejm in the 2005 election for Law and Justice, from the 12 – Chrzanów district. He won re-election in 2007.

In 2009, he ran for the European Parliament in the Lesser Poland and Świętokrzyskie constituency, including Chrzanów.  He came second amongst PiS candidates, behind Zbigniew Ziobro, taking the second Law and Justice seat won. He resigned his seat in the Sejm three days later.

During the 2010 Ukrainian presidential election Kowal was the head of the delegation of the European Parliament's observers.  He joined Poland Comes First when that party split from Law and Justice in 2010. In December 2013, he joined the new centre-right Poland Together party formed by Jarosław Gowin, the former minister of justice, formerly of Civic Platform.

In 2019 he was re-elected to the Sejm from Civic Coalition. He became deputy chairman of Foreign Affairs Committee.

Biography

Education and early career
Pawel Robert Kowal graduated from Fr. Stanisław Konarski High School in Rzeszow. Kowal graduated from the Faculty of History at the Jagiellonian University in 1999. He studied at Collegium Invisibile in Warsaw between 1996 and 1998 under Professor Krystyna Kersten. While there, he participated in study abroad programs in Russia in Yakutia, Buryatia, and Khakassia. In 1999, he became an assistant at the Institute of Political Studies at the Polish Academy of Sciences. There Kowal defended his doctoral thesis Politics of General Wojciech Jaruzelski's administration 1986-1989. Attempts at political system reform in January 2011.

He was habilitated on February 22, 2019 at the Institute of Social Sciences of the Polish Academy of Sciences (ISP PAN) in the field of social sciences, the same year he took up the position of professor at the Institute of Political Studies of the Polish Academy of Sciences. He also became a lecturer at the University of Warsaw's Eastern European Studies Department, and took the position of head of the Postgraduate Eastern Studies there. In his scholarly work, he has taken a special interest in the issues of Poland's and the EU's eastern policy and contemporary history. 

Between 1998 and 2000, Kowal worked in, amongst others, the office of the Prime Minister and the office of the head of the Polish Department of Foreign Affairs. In 2000-2001 he served as the Director of the Department of International Relations and European Integration in the Ministry of Culture and National Heritage. Between 2001 and 2003, he worked as an expert on Eastern foreign policy in the Center for International Relations. From 2003 to 2005, he was the director of the Mazovian Regional Center of Culture and the Arts. In 2003, Kowal co-founded the Warsaw Uprising Museum, and has worked as an expert for the Museum ever since. In 2005, he led the Press Office of the Mayor of Warsaw. He continues to contribute articles on international relations.

Political career
From 2002 to 2005, Kowal was the chairman of the Ochota district council in Warsaw. In the 2005 parliamentary elections, Kowal was elected to the Sejm from the okreg (electoral district) of Chrzanow as a member of Prawo i Sprawiedliwość (PiS) (Law and Justice), where he served as chairman of the Committee on Culture and Media and as Vice-President of PiS in the Sejm. Between 20 July 2006 and 22 November 2007, Kowal served as Secretary of State in the Polish Ministry of Foreign Affairs in President Jaroslaw Kaczynski's cabinet. Pawel Kowal was re-elected in the 2007 Sejm elections, and served again as Vice-President of PiS in the Sejm, as well as vice-president of the Foreign Affairs Committee.

Pawel Kowal was elected in 2009 to European Parliament from the Kraków electoral district. Once in Parliament, Mr. Kowal joined the Group of European Conservatives and Reformists (ECR), serving as Chairman of the parliamentary delegation to Ukraine.

Pawel Kowal left Law and Justice on November 22, 2010 to become a co-founder of Polska Jest Najważniejsza (PJN) (Poland Comes First). On June 4, 2011, he was elected the President of the party. On September 7 of the same year, he was appointed to the National Security Council. In December 2013 members of PJN decided to join the newly formed Poland Together party, where Paweł Kowal became the head of the party's National Committee. In October 2019, he successfully ran in the parliamentary elections with the Civic Coalition from the Cracow region.

Professional career

Kowal was the chairman of the Rzeszow Youth Council. Between 1996 and 1998, he served as the president of the Jagiellonian club while working in the Miroslaw Dzielski Center in Kraków. From 1997 to 2005 he worked in the Center for Political Thought, where he managed the Polish State program for Poles in the East. Kowal is a member of Association "Polish Community," a Polish Senate-sponsored organization dedicated to building ties between Poland and Polonia, and is also an associate member of the World Association of the Home Army. Kowal has worked with the Jan Nowak-Jeziorański program of the College of Eastern Europe (Kolegium Europy Wschodniej) in Wroclaw since 2007. He has also sat on the board of the Institute of Public Affairs, a Polish think tank. In 2008, he became an honorary member of the Volunteer Fire Department in Chocznia, Poland.

Private life
Kowal is married and has four children.

Awards and decorations
Officer of the Order of Polonia Restituta – 2014
Prof. T. Strzembosz Award – 2013
Order of Christ the Saviour (Ukraine) – 2013
Order of Merit (Portugal), Grand Cross – 2008
Order of Merit, Third Class (Ukraine) – 2007 (awarded in 2009)
Silver Medal for Merit to Culture – Gloria Artis (Poland) – 2005
Silver Guardian Medal of the Places of National Remembrance (Poland) – 2005

See also
Poland Comes First (PJN)
Members of Polish Sejm 2005-2007
Members of Polish Sejm 2007-2011
2009 European Parliament election in Poland
List of members of the European Parliament, 2009–2014
List of members of the European Parliament for Poland, 2009–2014

References

External links
Paweł Kowal - parliamentary page - includes declarations of interest, voting record, and transcripts of speeches. (not online any more, link to page included in waybackmachine archive).
Paweł Kowal - European Parliament page 
Member profile for Sixth Session of the Sejm
ECR information page
Personal website
Twitter account

Publications
"Only For People with Strong Nerves" (New Eastern Europe)
"Lutsenko's Release Was A Triumph For All, Except Ukraine" (The Ukrainian Week)
"Treat Lukashenko With Respect" (Belarus Digest) 
"Doves vs. Hawks: A post-election draw" (New Eastern Europe)

Academic articles
Państwo polskie wobec Polaków na Wschodzie (współautor), Kraków 2000
Włodzimierz Bączkowski. O wschodnich problemach Polski. Wybór pism (współautor), Kraków 2000, Wrocław 2005
Nie jesteśmy ukrainofilami (współautor), Wrocław 2002, 2008
„Wymiar wschodni” UE – szansa czy idée fixe polskiej polityki? (redaktor, współautor), Warszawa 2002
Krajobrazy z Mistralami w tle, Kraków 2011
Koniec systemu władzy. Polityka ekipy gen. Wojciecha Jaruzelskiego w latach 1986–1989, Warszawa 2012
Między Majdanem a Smoleńskiem. Rozmawiają Piotr Legutko i Dobrosław Rodziewicz, Wydawnictwo Literackie, Kraków 2012

Members of the Polish Sejm 2005–2007
Members of the Polish Sejm 2007–2011
Members of the Polish Sejm 2019–2023
MEPs for Poland 2009–2014
Poland Comes First politicians
Law and Justice politicians
Law and Justice MEPs
1975 births
Living people
People from Rzeszów
Recipients of the Order of Merit (Ukraine), 3rd class
Recipients of the Silver Medal for Merit to Culture – Gloria Artis
Poland Together MEPs
Officers of the Order of Polonia Restituta
Grand Crosses of the Order of Merit (Portugal)
Academic staff of Jagiellonian University
Jagiellonian University alumni
Polish political scientists
21st-century Polish historians
Polish male non-fiction writers